Jugend-Internationale (German: The Youth International) was a monthly communist youth magazine which was published in Switzerland between 1915 and 1928. It was the official media outlet of the International League of Socialist Youth Organisations.

History and profile
Jugend-Internationale was launched in Zurich by the International League of Socialist Youth Organisations in 1915. Willi Münzenberg was named as its first editor. Its publisher was the secretariat of the organization. The magazine came out monthly, and its first eleven issues were published in Zurich until 1918. It supported the left-wing faction in the Swiss Social Democratic Party. Major contributors included many leading communists, including Vladimir Lenin, Leon Trotsky, Grigory Zinoviev, Karl Radek, Alexandra Kollontai, Karl Liebknecht, Otto Rühle, Eduard Bernstein, Friedrich Adler, and Robert Danneberg. György Lukács, a member of the Hungarian Communist Party, also published articles in Jugend-Internationale in 1921.

Eleven issues of Jugend-Internationale were also published in Russia, and four issues appeared in Denmark and Sweden. Its circulation was 160,000 copies in 1921. Jugend-Internationale folded in 1928.

References

1915 establishments in Switzerland
1928 disestablishments in Switzerland
Communist magazines
Defunct magazines published in Switzerland
Defunct political magazines
German-language magazines
Magazines established in 1915
Magazines disestablished in 1928
Monthly magazines published in Switzerland
Political magazines published in Switzerland
Magazines published in Zürich